The sixteenth season of the American police procedural crime drama television series Criminal Minds, subtitled Evolution,  follows members of the Behavioral Analysis Unit (BAU) as they are faced with a network of serial killers built during the COVID-19 pandemic. It is a revival of the 2005 television series, which ended in 2020. The season premiered on November 24, 2022 on Paramount+ in the U.S. and on Disney+ in other regions on November 25, 2022.

In January 2023, Evolution was renewed for another season.

Cast

Main 
 Joe Mantegna as David Rossi
 AJ Cook as Jennifer "JJ" Jareau
 Kirsten Vangsness as Penelope Garcia
 Aisha Tyler as Dr. Tara Lewis
 Adam Rodriguez as Luke Alvez
 Paget Brewster as Emily Prentiss

Recurring 
 Zach Gilford as Elias Voit
 Josh Stewart as Will LaMontagne Jr.
 Nicholas D'Agosto as Deputy Director Doug Bailey
 Nicole Pacent as Rebecca Wilson
 Ryan-James Hatanaka as Tyler Green
 Kiele Sanchez as Sydney Voit

Guests 
 Gail O'Grady as Krystall Rossi
 Luke Benward as Benjamin Reeves
  Silas Weir Mitchell as Cyrus Lebrun

Episodes

Production

Development 
In February 2021, a revival series and the sixteenth season of Criminal Minds was announced to be in early development at Paramount+ with 10 episodes planned. In February 2022, the series was confirmed to be still in development. Paramount+ officially gave a series order in July 2022. The official title of the new series was revealed in September 2022.

Casting 
Most of the main cast of the last season of the previous series returned, with the exception of Matthew Gray Gubler and Daniel Henney. On September 4, 2022, Josh Stewart confirmed he would reprise his role as Will LaMontagne Jr. On September 9, 2022, Zach Gilford was cast in a recurring role.

Filming 
Filming began in August 2022. In September 2022, Joe Mantegna announced that he would be directing an episode this season. Later that month, it was confirmed that A. J. Cook, Aisha Tyler and Adam Rodriguez would also be directing episodes this season.

References 

Criminal Minds
2022 American television seasons
2023 American television seasons